Lynceidae is a family of clam shrimp in the order Laevicaudata. There are about 5 genera and more than 20 described species in Lynceidae.

Genera
These five genera belong to the family Lynceidae:
 Leptestheriella
 Limnetis Loven, 1846
 Lynceiopsis Daday, 1912
 Lynceus Müller, 1776
 Paralimnetis Gurney, 1931-17

References

Further reading

 
 
 

Diplostraca
Articles created by Qbugbot
Crustacean families